Eriogonum corymbosum var. nilesii is a rare variety of Eriogonum corymbosum, a species of Polygonaceae, commonly known as Nile's wild buckwheat, Las Vegas buckwheat, or golden buckwheat.  The plant can be found in the Mojave Desert, located in the Las Vegas Valley and Muddy Mountains region of Clark County, Nevada.

References

External links
Nevada Natural Heritage Fact Sheet
Flora of North America

corymbosum var. nilesii
Flora of Nevada